Max Strus (born March 28, 1996) is an American professional basketball player for the Miami Heat  of the National Basketball Association (NBA). He played college basketball for the Lewis Flyers and the DePaul Blue Demons.

Early life and high school career
Strus was born in the Chicago suburb of Hickory Hills, Illinois and attended Amos Alonzo Stagg High School, where he was a member of the baseball and basketball teams. Although he entered his sophomore year at 5'9", he had a late growth spurt and was 6'6" by the end of high school. As a senior, Strus averaged 19 points and nine rebounds per game and was named the area player of the year by The Reporter, All-Southwest Suburban Conference, All-Area by the SouthtownStar and third team All-State. After having only received one Division I offer (Chicago State), Strus committed to play at Division II Lewis University, where his older brother Marty had played.

College career

Lewis
Strus began his collegiate career at Lewis University. As a freshman, Strus averaged 13.3 points and 5.3 rebounds per game and started all 31 of the Flyers' games and was named second team All-Great Lakes Valley Conference (GLVC). As a sophomore, Strus averaged 20.2 points, 8.4 rebounds, and 3.5 assists per game-all team highs-and was named first team all-GLVC and an honorable mention Division II All-American. He also set school records with 167 free throws made and 666 points scored in a single season and points scored in a game with 52 (14 for 18 shooting) against Northwood University on November 24, 2015. Following the season, Strus announced that he would be leaving the program in order to play at the Division I level. Strus scored 1,078 points in his two seasons at Lewis.

DePaul
Strus transferred to DePaul for the final two seasons of his eligibility after considering offers from Butler, Louisville, Oregon and Xavier. After sitting out one season due to NCAA transfer rules, Strus began his redshirt junior season on the Blue Demons in the starting lineup and led the team with 16.8 points per game and 81 three-pointers made (second most in school history). He reached double figures in scoring in 26 of the 31 games he played in. He declared for the 2018 NBA Draft, but returned to school for his final season. In his final season, Strus averaged 20.1 points, 5.9 rebounds, 2.2 assists and 0.9 steals per game and was named second team All-Big East Conference. He became only the second Blue Demons player ever to score 700 points in a season after former 1st Overall draft pick Mark Aguirre with 705 points and set single season school records for three-point shots taken (311) and made (113). In two seasons, Strus scored 1,226 points (29th in school history), 554 three-point attempts (second), and 194 three-pointers made (third) and finished with the fifth-highest free throw percentage at .825 (226-274).

Professional career

Boston Celtics/Chicago Bulls (2019–2020)
After going undrafted in the 2019 NBA draft, Strus was named to the Boston Celtics Summer League roster. He averaged 9.8 points per game and shot 45 percent from three for the Celtics. On July 22, 2019, Strus signed a two-way contract with the team. On October 13, 2019, the Celtics announced that they had signed Strus to a standard NBA contract in order to sign Tacko Fall to one of the team's two two-way roster spots. The roster move put Strus in direct competition with Javonte Green for the final spot on the Celtics' opening day roster. He was ultimately cut shortly before to the start of the regular season.

After being waived by the Celtics, Strus signed a two-way contract with his hometown team the Chicago Bulls on October 22, 2019. Strus made his NBA debut on November 22, 2019 against the Miami Heat, playing the final five minutes of a 116-108 loss and scoring five points with one rebound. On December 23, 2019, the Chicago Bulls announced that Strus suffered a torn anterior cruciate ligament and bone bruise on his left knee in an NBA G League game for Windy City Bulls in a 92–85 win over the Lakeland Magic on December 21 and Strus was expected to be sidelined for about eight to twelve months. Strus ended his rookie season with five points scored in two NBA games played and averaged 18.2 points, 5.8 rebounds and 3.2 assists in 13 G League games.

Miami Heat (2020–present)
On November 30, 2020, Strus signed a training camp contract with the Miami Heat. The Heat converted his contract to a two-way contract on December 19, 2020 towards the end of training camp. On February 11, 2021, he came on in a game against the Rockets and scored 21 points on 5 of 8 three point shooting.

On August 1, 2021, Strus joined the Heat for the NBA Summer League and five days later, he signed a two-year contract worth $3.5 million to remain with the Heat.

Career statistics

NBA

Regular season

|-
| style="text-align:left;"|
| style="text-align:left;"|Chicago
| 2 || 0 || 3.0 || .667 || .000 || 1.000 || .5 || .0 || .0 || .0 || 2.5
|-
| style="text-align:left;"| 
| style="text-align:left;"| Miami
| 39 || 0 || 13.0 || .455 || .338 || .667 || 1.1 || .6 || .3 || .1 || 6.1
|-
| style="text-align:left;"| 
| style="text-align:left;"| Miami
| 68 || 16 || 23.3 || .441 || .410 || .792 || 3.0 || 1.4 || .4 || .2 || 10.6
|- class="sortbottom"
| style="text-align:center;" colspan="2"|Career
| 109 || 16 || 19.3 || .446 || .391 || .756 || 2.2 || 1.1 || .4 || .2 || 8.8

Playoffs

|-
| style="text-align:left;"|2021
| style="text-align:left;"|Miami
| 2 || 0 || 3.0 || .000 ||  ||  || .0 || .0 || .0 || .0 || .0
|-
| style="text-align:left;"|2022
| style="text-align:left;"|Miami
| 18 || 18 || 29.1 || .374 || .331 || .722 || 4.1 || 2.1 || .8 || .4 || 10.9
|-class="sortbottom"
| style="text-align:center;" colspan="2"| Career 
| 20 || 18 || 26.5 || .372 || .331 || .722 || 3.7 || 1.9 || .7 || .4 || 9.8

College

NCAA Division I

|-
| style="text-align:left;"|2017–18
| style="text-align:left;"|DePaul
| 31 || 31 || 35.6 || .408 || .333 || .803 || 5.7|| 2.7 || 1.3|| .5 || 16.8
|-
| style="text-align:left;"|2018–19
| style="text-align:left;"|DePaul
| 35 || 35 || 37.4 || .429 || .363 || .842 || 5.9 || 2.2 || .9 || .5 || 20.1
|- class="sortbottom"
| style="text-align:center;" colspan="2"|Career
| 66 || 66 || 36.6 || .420 || .350 || .825 || 5.8 || 2.5 || 1.1 || .5 || 18.6

NCAA Division II

|-
| style="text-align:left;"|2014–15
| style="text-align:left;"|Lewis
| 31 || 31 || 28.8 || .521 || .352 || .773 || 5.3 || 2.2 || 1.5 || .8 || 13.3
|-
| style="text-align:left;"|2015–16
| style="text-align:left;"|Lewis
| 33 || 33 || 36.2|| .455 || .360 || .823 || 8.4 || 3.5 || 1.2 || .8 || 20.2
|- class="sortbottom"
| style="text-align:center;" colspan="2"|Career
| 64 || 64 || 32.6 || .479 || .357 || .807 || 6.9 || 2.9 || 1.4 || .8 || 16.8

Personal life
Strus's father, John, played college baseball as a pitcher for Eastern Illinois and his mother, Debra, played basketball and volleyball at DePaul and was inducted into the school's Athletic Hall of Fame in 2000. His older brother, Marty, also played basketball at Lewis and is currently the head coach at Stagg High School. He also has an older sister, Maggie, who played college volleyball at the University of Illinois at Chicago and is currently an assistant volleyball coach at DePaul.

References

External links

 Lewis Flyers bio
 DePaul Blue Demons bio

1996 births
Living people
American men's basketball players
Basketball players from Illinois
Chicago Bulls players
DePaul Blue Demons men's basketball players
Lewis Flyers men's basketball players
Miami Heat players
Shooting guards
Small forwards
Sportspeople from Cook County, Illinois
Undrafted National Basketball Association players
Windy City Bulls players